Eumorphus alboguttatus is a species of beetles belonging to the family Endomychidae.

Description
The basic color of the elytra is black, with large yellow spots.

Distribution
This species can be found in Java.

References

External links
 Genus Eumorphus
 

Beetles described in 1857
Endomychidae